Neck of the humerus may refer to:
 Surgical neck of the humerus
 Anatomical neck of humerus